Joseph Phillips may refer to:

Sports 
Joseph Phillips (Australian cricketer) (1840–1901), Australian cricketer
Joseph Phillips (Barbadian cricketer) (1891-1958), Barbadian cricketer
Joseph Phillips (English cricketer) (1881–1951), English cricketer
Joseph Phillips (field hockey) (1911–1986), Indian Olympic field hockey player
Joseph Phillips (rugby league) (1924–1969), New Zealand rugby league and rugby union player
Joe Phillips (American football) (Joseph Gordon Phillips, born 1963), American football defensive tackle

Other fields 
Joseph Phillips (judge), American jurist and politician
Joseph Phillips (Wisconsin politician) (1825–1906), mayor of Milwaukee, Wisconsin
Joseph C. Phillips (born 1962), African American actor and conservative Christian commentator

See also
Joe Phillips (born 1969), American comic book artist
Joker Phillips (Joe Phillips, born 1963), American football coach